Frank Klaus (December 30, 1887, in Turtle Creek, Pennsylvania – February 8, 1948) was an American boxer from 1904 to 1918. Klaus claimed the vacant World Middleweight Championship in 1913 and was elected to the Ring Boxing Hall of Fame in 1974. 

Gifted with a strong punch, he lost exceptionally few fights in his nine-year career, and was knocked out only once. Nat Fleischer ranked Klaus sixth as the All-Time Middleweight. His manager was George Engel.

Early life and career
Frank Klaus was born on December 30, 1887, to German-American parents in Turtle Creek, Pennsylvania, near Pittsburgh. He worked as a young man at the Westinghouse Machine Shop, and also mined coal with his father.  

He started boxing training early and after winning an amateur tournament at East Pittsburgh's Wilmerding Athletic Club was recognized to have boxing promise by local boxing mentor George Engel. He began his amateur career as early as 1904, and in February 1905 had three round wins on points in Pittsburgh against Frank Walton, and James Harris.

On October 18, 1911, Klaus defeated the great contender Leo Houck in a newspaper win by both the Philadelphia Item and the Philadelphia Record. During his career, the Pennsylvania-born middleweight fought some of the greatest welter, middle, and light heavyweights of his era, including Jack Dillon, Battling Levinsky, Mike Gibbons, Harry Greb, and Al McCoy.

Claiming and defending the World Middleweight Title

Klaus claimed the World Middleweight Title a few years after it became vacant upon the death of Stanley Ketchel in October 1910. Several contenders competed for the title. Accounts vary as to when Klaus was officially champion, but Klaus himself first claimed the title after defeating Sailor Ed Petrosky in a 20-round points decision in San Francisco on February 22, 1912. His victories over Jack Dillon, and later fellow claimant Georges Carpentier and former champion Billy Papke in France, cemented his claim to the title. He was officially recognized as champion by sanctioning bodies on March 5, 1913.

In his historic title bout against Georges Carpentier on June 24, 1912, in Dieppe, France, Klaus won on a nineteenth round disqualification when Carpentier's manager entered the ring to protest his boxer being elbowed repeatedly by Klaus. Carpentier's manager tried to pull his fighter from the ring by his waist, but the boxer's second had already thrown in the towel.

On September 9, 1912, Klaus defeated Marcel Moreau in Savoie, France as the result of a low blow foul in the fourth of fifteen rounds. Moureau had held the French Middleweight Title in May 1908.

Defeating Billy Papke for the Middleweight Title

In a title fight that led to world title recognition, Klaus defeated American Billy Papke at the Cirque du Paris on March 5, 1913, in a fifteenth-round disqualification. The referee stopped the fight in the fifteenth as a result of Papke continually ignoring his requests to fight cleanly. Klaus was winning by a significant margin. Papke had been warned throughout the fight for flagrant violations of boxing rules. Klaus received a gold belt for the victory.

In another important win that cemented his claim to the title, Klaus defeated contender Eddie McGoorty on May 24, 1913, in a six-round bout in Pittsburgh. The Pittsburgh Gazette gave Klaus five of the six rounds.

On July 1, 1913, Klaus had an important win where he was awarded a third-round TKO against Jimmy Gardner in Boston. Gardner had contended for the World Welterweight Championship earlier in his career.  Gardner put up a great defense until the end of the second round, when Klaus threw some hard punches over the defenses of Gardner. After Klaus continued to connect with hard blows, a second of Gardner's jumped into the ring in the middle of the third round to end the fight.  Klaus had faced Gardner on at least three previous occasions.

Losing the World Middleweight Title to George Chip
During a title fight on 11 October 1913, George Chip baffled the crowd when he knocked out Klaus with a strong right hook to the jaw. The knockout came near the end of the sixth and final round. Prior to the knockout, in the first five rounds, Chip never threatened to take the lead. The fight occurred at the old Pittsburgh City Hall at Market Square . It was the first loss by knockout in Klaus's career. The extra weight Klaus was carrying in his midsection led many reporters to believe he had not trained adequately for the bout, and had underestimated the ability of his opponent.

In a return non-title match on December 23, 1913, Chip defeated Klaus again. In the fifth round of six, the referee stopped the fight resulting in a technical knockout after Chip knocked Klaus to the mat for a second time. In what most considered a decisive win, the Scranton Truth wrote that Chip was the master of Klaus in every way, and clearly deserved the title he had taken from him two months earlier.

Retirement from boxing and death
Klaus retired from boxing at age 26 shortly after his second loss to George Chip.

Klaus died February 8, 1948, at his home in Pittsburgh, Pennsylvania after a severe heart attack. He was survived by his widow, two sons and three daughters.

Professional boxing record
All information in this section is derived from BoxRec, unless otherwise stated.

Official record

All newspaper decisions are officially regarded as “no decision” bouts and are not counted in the win/loss/draw column

Unofficial record

Record with the inclusion of newspaper decision in the win/loss/draw column.

Boxing achievements

|-

|-

Honors
Klaus was elected into the International Boxing Hall of Fame in 2008.

See also
List of middleweight boxing champions

References

External links
Klaus' Record at Cyber Boxing Zone

1887 births
1948 deaths
People from Turtle Creek, Pennsylvania
American people of German descent
Boxers from Pennsylvania
Middleweight boxers
World middleweight boxing champions
Sportspeople from the Pittsburgh metropolitan area
American male boxers